Sirica was the surname of American federal judge John Sirica (1904-1992).

Sirica also may refer to:
 Alphonse Sirica, American cancer and bile-duct research scientist
 Sirica (Kirby), a fictional character, daughter of Garlude, appearing in episode 60 of the Japanese animated television series Kirby: Right Back at Ya!

See also 
 Similar surnames of Italian origin:
 Sirico
 Serpico